Glenna Matthews is an American historian.

Biography
Glenna Matthews graduated in 1969 with a bachelor in Arts degree from San José State University. She later completed her Ph.D. from Stanford University in 1977. She went on to teach at Oklahoma State University, Stanford, Berkeley, and University of California, Los Angeles. She retired from university but continues to lecture on history. She has been a consultant on the film Indians, Outlaws and Angie Debo in 1989. She has written several books about American women's history. She has received fellowships the National Endowment for the Humanities as well as being a Fulbright scholar. Using interviews created for her book on Silicon valley Matthews created the Glenna Matthews Oral History Collection, 1984-2014 which contains fifty-one oral histories.

Bibliography
 “Just a Housewife”: The Rise and Fall of Domesticity in America ISBN 9780195059250
 The Rise of Public Woman: Woman’s Power and Woman’s Place, 1630–1970. ISBN 9780199951314
 Silicon Valley, Women, and the California Dream ISBN 9780804741545
 The Golden State in the Civil War  ISBN 9780521194006

References

Living people
People from California
American historians
Year of birth missing (living people)